Pseudophilautus microtympanum, also known as Gunther's bubble-nest frog or small-eared shrub frog, is a species of frog in the family Rhacophoridae. It is endemic to the central hills of Sri Lanka. Its natural habitat are both closed and open canopy habitats. Sub-adults and juveniles are more often found in grassland and disturbed habitats, whereas adult frogs are usually found in closed-canopy habitats. It is threatened by habitat loss, agrochemical pollution, and the desiccation of its habitat.

References

microtympanum
Frogs of Sri Lanka
Endemic fauna of Sri Lanka
Amphibians described in 1858
Taxa named by Albert Günther
Taxonomy articles created by Polbot